Air Force F.C. is an Eritrean football club based in Dekemhare.

Football clubs in Eritrea
Dekemhare
Military association football clubs